Stephen Wearne may refer to:

Stephen Wearne (Australian footballer) (born 1968), Australian rules footballer
Stephen Wearne (English footballer) (born 2000), English association footballer